Harkuşta (Harkushta) is a Turkish dance. The original form of the folk dance  was popular in  Bitlis in Eastern Anatolia Region Turkey.

Origin 
Harkushta, or Yarkhushta is originally an Armenian folk and martial dance associated with the highlands of the historical region of Sassoun in Western Armenia.

Yarkhushta is believed to have its origins in the early Middle Ages as it is mentioned in the works of Movses Khorenatsi, Faustus of Byzantium, and Grigor Magistros.

Regional variation
Each region have their own version of the dance. This dance was especially popular in the regions of (Çabukay) Bingöl, (Yalkuşta) Muş, (Yarkıştan) Van, (Çapıki or Çepikey) Mardin, (Herküşte) Malazgirt, (El Ele Çarpışmak) Elazığ, (Karakıştanî or Karakuştanî) Siirt, (Akışta) Kars and Artvin.

Video links 
Harkuşta

References

See also
Yarkhushta
Karadır kaşların ferman yazdırır

Turkish dances